First Run Features is an independent film distribution company based in New York City.

History
First Run was founded in 1979 by a group of filmmakers in order to advance the distribution of independent film.  In the 1980s, the company focused on more mainstream documentaries and started distributing films on video.

It is one of America's largest independent distributors of documentaries and art films, releasing 12 to 15 films a year in theaters nationwide and 40 to 60 titles on DVD and VOD annually. First Run distributes a large number of documentaries and foreign films, including many films about LGBT issues, Jewish experience, and political and human rights issues.

First Run is the American distributor for Michael Apted's Up series, Ross McElwee's Sherman's March, the Oscar-nominated The Most Dangerous Man in America, Maidentrip, Girl Model, Eames: The Architect and the Painter, For the Bible Tells Me So, A Jihad for Love, God Loves Uganda , D. A. Pennebaker and Chris Hegedus's Kings of Pastry, Joe Berlinger's Crude, Alex Gibney and Eugene Jarecki's The Trials of Henry Kissinger, Alice, Save Me, Anita: Speaking Truth to Power and Moving Midway, among many others. Many of the films First Run Features has distributed have been endorsed by Human Rights Watch.

Notable films

References

Sources
 First Run Features website
 First Run Features box office